Asoprochona is a suburb north of the capital Accra in the Accra Metropolis District of the Greater Accra Region of Ghana.

Transport 
Asoprochona is served by a railway station on the eastern part of the national railway network, and is indeed a suburban terminus.

The station has a loop to enable locomotives to runaround the train.

See also 
 Railway stations in Ghana

References

External links 
 Train Station

Populated places in the Greater Accra Region